Sadia Gul (born 4 March 1998 in Bannu) is a Pakistani professional squash player. As of February 2018, she was ranked number 91 in the world.

References

1998 births
Living people
Pakistani female squash players
People from Bannu District
South Asian Games bronze medalists for Pakistan
South Asian Games medalists in squash